Below are the team squads  for the Baseball at the 2004 Summer Olympics which took place in the Helliniko Olympic Complex, from August 15 to August 25.

Australia
Manager: 24 – Jon Deeble.

Coaches: 2 – Tony Harris, 33 – Paul Elliott, 34 – Philip Dale.

Canada
Manager: 12 – Ernie Whitt

Coaches: 42 – Denis Boucher, 7 – Marty Lehn, 10 – Greg Hamilton, 21 – Tim Leiper.

Chinese Taipei
Manager: 85 – Hsu Sheng Ming (Chinatrust Whales).

Coaches: 29 – Lee Lai-Fa(National Training Team), 4 – Lin I-Tseng (Brother Elephants), 80 – Mitsujiro Sakai, 81 – Yang Shien-Ming (Fubon Bull).

Cuba
Manager: 39 – Higinio Vélez

Coach: 22 – Carlos Pérez Cepero, 30 – Pedro José Delgado Pérez, 34 – José Sánchez Elosegui, 41 – Francisco Laza Escaurrido Chapelle

Greece
Manager: 27 – Jack Rhodes.

Coaches: 1 – Mike Riskas, 14 – Ioannis Kazanas, 42 – Scott Demtral.

Italy
Manager: 30 – Giampiero Faraone.

Coaches: 8 – Claudio Corradi, 12 – Manuel Cortina, 27 – Salvatore Varriale.

Japan
Manager: 33 – Kiyoshi Nakahata.

Coaches: 31 – Yutaka Takagi, 32 – Yutaka Ohno.

Netherlands
Manager: 6 – Robert Eenhoorn.

Coaches: 17 – Eric de Bruin, 30 – Davey Johnson, 32 – Hensley Meulens.

References

Team squads
2004